Haeeunlee(First 'National sister')() is a South Korean female singer and broadcaster.

Career 
At her peak in the late 1970s, she was the most popular singer in South Korea. 

Popular songs include "You Won't Know", "Passion", "Gam-Soo-Kwang"(), "The 3rd Hangang Bridge"(), "I Love Only You"(), "Teetee Pangpang"(), "Monologue"(), "Threnody"(), and "Blue World"().   

She belongs to Arang Entertainment(()). She is the singer Yoyomi() respects most.

She debuted in 1975 by releasing an album containing the song "You Won't Know"(). With her explosive vocal power and beauty, the "Haeeunlee" syndrome arose. In 1977, her 2nd album I Really Really Love You and 3rd album I Love Only You both topped the list.  

She was awarded "the Best Singer Award", "Singer King", and "Best Popular Singer Award".  She was also a leader in fashion. In addition, the title songs from her 1st to 14th albums ranked first.

She won the prize at the Pacific Music Festival in 1978. She is the original "Hallyu star" and was linked with actor Kim Ja-ok(). She sparked a disco craze with "The Third Hangang Bridge". She led the first sister's squad and created trends in fashion and hairstyles.

Since 1977, she was invited to the broadcasting station awards ceremony seven times in a row. In 1977 and 1979, She won "the Singer King"" and "Best Popular Song Award" ("I only love you", "the 3rd Hangang Bridge") at MBC's "Top 10 Singers Song Festival". From 1978 to 1980s, she won the TBC "Women's Popularity Award". She was selected as the most popular singer by foreign journalists in Korea from 1977 to 1980. In 1977, She won the KBS "Music Awards()" – "Best Popularity Award" and the TBC "Women's Singer Award", and in the same year, she won the MBC "Entertainment Awards" in the "Singer Category", and in 1977, She won all the Korean singer awards.

Even in the 2000s, she is consistently loved by the public and often appears on the KBS 1TV "Golden Oldies"().

Albums 
List of albums:

 You Won't Know - 1 December 1975
 I Really Really Like You - June 1977  (Teetee Pangpang)
 I Love Only You - July 1977 
 Christmas and Happy New Year - November 1977 (Carol/Basic 4th album)
 Forever, Seoul - December 1977 (Gam-Soo-Kwang)
 Forever Only You - August 1978  (Seogwipo's Dream)
 The 3rd Hangang Bridge - March 1979   (I Am You)
 Dawn Rain - August 1979  (Migratory Birds)
 Graduation - December 1979  (I don't cry)
  Regrets - June 1980  (Remembrance)
  The Stone Wall of Old Love - December 1980  (You and Me)
  Please Forget - August 1981 (Child Without Mother)
  Monologue - October 1982 (Jealousy)
  Little Lady - August 1983  (Children)
  End of Breakup - July 1984   (Okay)
  Passion - September 1985  (Blue World)
  Past History - January 1987  (Pinocchio)
  Threnody - March 1989  (You Like the Wind)
  My Man - July 1990 (Lost Memories)
  Traces of the wind - October 1992 (I am a woman)
  Standing in this darkness and looking at the sky - November 1995
  I have to be strong - December 2006 (Still)
  Tear's Well - May 2015  (Loneliness Comes)
  Yeah - April 2020 (Reunion) released

Drama 
 Why are you doing that - MBC 1977
 Detective Kim, Detective Kang - MBC 1990)
 Hello - SBS 1995) 
 Corporal Oh - SBS 1996)

References

External links 
 Arang Entertainment – Haeeunlee

1954 births
Living people
21st-century South Korean women singers
20th-century South Korean women singers